The Hunts Point Cooperative Market is a 24/7 wholesale food market located on  in the Hunts Point neighborhood of the Bronx, New York City. The largest food distribution center of its kind in the world, it earns annual revenues of over $2 billion.

Located at the Hunts Point Food Distribution Center, which houses the Fulton Fish Market and a produce market, the Hunts Point Cooperative Market is the source for approximately 50 percent of the New York region’s meat. More than 50 independent wholesale food businesses located at the Market supply food to over 22 million people in the New York metropolitan area.

History 

It is governed by the United States Department of Agriculture (USDA). The produce market alone is spread across 1,600 refrigerated diesel-powered trailers running 24/7, although the New York City Department of Transportation has implemented pilot programs and announced long-term plans to replace these units with electric or hybrid options. 

The Hunts Point Department of Public Safety, a private owned and operated public safety department, it was formed in 1985 to patrol the Hunts Point Market. Currently about 45 Special Patrolmen are employed at the department.

In 2011, the City of New York and the New York City Economic Development Corporation (NYCEDC) made significant headway in their ongoing efforts to support the Hunts Point Market in the South Bronx. In June, they reached an agreement with the Hunts Point Terminal Produce Cooperative to extend its lease for another three years, while the Cooperative and NYCEDC work together to develop a long-term plan for a larger, modernized facility in the Bronx. To this end, the City and State have each agreed to contribute capital resources and to work with the Cooperative to secure additional third-party sources of funding.

In January 2021, over 1400 workers at the market arranged a strike in support of a $1-per-hour wage increase and a $0.60 hourly increase for healthcare benefits. This strike was the first to occur at the market since 1986, though in 2012 opposing a 14 cent hourly increase and in 2015 opposing a $25-per-week raise, Local 202 threatened strikes in support of higher wage increases. This strike was the first major work stoppage of the year (a stoppage involving over 1000 workers).

Transportation
The market can be accessed from other boroughs via the Bruckner Expressway (Interstate 278) and Sheridan Boulevard (New York State Route 895). It is serviced by rail via CSX Transportation's Oak Point Yard and gets around 2700 cars per year. In 2012 the market received a $10 million federal grant to improve rail operations. Currently, rail cars and trucks share unloading docks, causing conflicts. The rail improvements are part of a $332.5 million major renovation to the market that is under negotiation. In 2015, Mayor Bill de Blasio announced that New York would spend $150 million over 12 years to modernize the market. At that time, the market had 115 private wholesalers at the bazaar employing around 8,000 people.

References

External links

Hunts Point Produce Market
 Hunts Point Cooperative Market

Food markets in the United States
Rail freight transportation in New York City
Buildings and structures in the Bronx
Commercial buildings completed in 1962
Hunts Point, Bronx
1962 establishments in New York City